The 1821 Coronation Honours were appointments by King George IV to various orders and honours on the occasion of his coronation on 19 July 1821. The honours were published in The London Gazette on 14, 24 and 28 July 1821.

The recipients of honours are displayed here as they were styled before their new honour.

United Kingdom and British Empire

Viscount, Earl, and Marquess 
Charles, Earl of Ailesbury  by the names, styles, and titles of Viscount Savernake, of Savernake Forest, in the county of Wilts, Earl Bruce, of Whorlton, in the county of York, and Marquess of Ailesbury, in the county of Buckingham

Earl
Edward, Viscount Falmouth, by the name, style, and title of, Earl of Falmouth, in the county of Cornwall
Richard William Penn, Viscount Curzon, by the name, style, and title of Earl Howe

Viscount and Earl
John Somers, Baron Somers, by the names, styles, and titles of Viscount Eastnor, of Eastnor Castle, in the county of Hereford, and Earl Somers
John Baron Rous, by the names, styles, and titles of Viscount Dumwich and Earl of Stradbroke, in the county of Suffolk

Viscount
Richard, Earl of Donoughmore, by the name, style, and title of Viscount Hutchinson, of Knocklofty, in the county of Tipperary

Baron
William, Marquess of Lothian  by the name, style, and title of Baron Ker, of Kersheugh, in the county of Roxburgh
Henry, Marquess Conyngham  by the name, style, and title of Baron Minster, of Minster Abbey, in the county of Kent
James, Earl of Ormonde and Ossory, by the name, style, and title of Baron Ormonde, of Llanthony, in the county of Monmouth
Francis, Earl of Wemyss and March, by the name, style, and title of Baron Wemyss, of Wemyss, in the county of Fife
Robert, Earl of Roden  by the name, style, and title of Baron Clanbrassill, of Hyde Hall, in the county of Hertford, and Dundalk, in the county of Louth
George, Earl of Kingston, by the name, style, and title of Baron Kingston, of Mitchelstown, in the county of Cork
Thomas, Earl of Longford  by the name, style and title of Baron Silchester, of Silchester, in the county of Southampton
Lord James Murray, by the name, style, and title of Baron Glenlyon of Glenlyon, in the county of Perth
The Right Honourable William Wellesley-Pole, by the name, style, and title of Baron Maryborough, of Maryborough, in the Queen's County.
The Right Honourable John Foster, by the name, style, and title of Baron Oriel, of Ferrard, in the county of Louth
The Right Honourable Sir William Scott  by the name, style, and title of Baron Stowell, of Stowell Park, in the county of Gloucester
Sir Thomas Henry Liddell  by the name, style, and title of Baron Ravensworth, of Ravensworth Castle, in the county palatine of Durham, and of Eslington, in the county of Northumberland
Thomas Cholmondeley, of Vale Royal, in the county palatine of Chester, by the name, style, and title of Baron Delamere, of Vale Royal, in the said county
Cecil Weld-Forester, of Willey Park, in the county of Shropshire, by the name, style, and title of Baron Forester, of Willey Park, in the said county

Baroness
Lady Charlotte Mary Gertrude Strutt, by the name, style, and title of Baroness Rayleigh, of Terling Place in the county of Essex

Baronetcies

Major-General Sir Edward Kerrison  of Wyke House in the county of Sussex
Sir Harry Niven Lumsden  of Auchindour, in the county of Aberdeen
Thomas Francis Fremantle, of Swanbourne, in the county of Buckingham
John Dugdale Astley, of Everleigh, in the county of Wiltshire
Alexander Boswell, of Auchinleck, in the county of Ayr
Robert Shaw, of Bushy Park, in the county of Dublin
Arthur Chichester, of Greencastle, in the county of Donegal
George Pocock, of Hart, in the county palatine of Durham, and of Twickenham, in the county of Middlesex
William George Hylton Jolliffe, of Merstham in the county of Surrey
Robert Townsend Farquhar, Governor and Commander in Chief in and over the Island of Mauritius
Major Thomas Trayton Fuller-Eliott-Drake, of Nutwell Court, Buckland Abbey, of Monachorum, Sherford, and Yarcombe, in the county of Devon
John Eardley Eardley-Wilmot, of Berkswell Hall, in the county of Warwick
Robert Dundas, of Beechwood, in the county of Midlothian
Colonel James Carmichael-Smyth, of Nutwood, in the county of Surrey
David Erskine, of Cambo, in the county of Fife
William Young, of Bailieborough Castle, in the county of Cavan
John D'Oyly, of Kandy, in the inland of Ceylon
David William Smith, of the province of Upper Canada, and of Preston, in the county of Northumberland
Astley Paston Cooper, of Gadesbridge, in the county of Hertford, Surgeon to His Majesty's Person
Thomas Phillipps, of Middle Hill, in the county of Worcester
John Dean Paul, of Rodborough, in the county of Gloucester, and of the Strand, in the county of Middlesex
Coutts Trotter, of West Ville, in the county of Lincoln
Claude Scott, of Lytchet Minster, in the county of Dorset
George Blackman, of Harley Street, in the county of Middlesex

The Most Ancient and Most Noble Order of the Thistle

Knight of the Most Ancient and Most Noble Order of the Thistle (KT)
Charles, Marquess of Queensberry 
Archibald, Earl of Cassilis
James, Earl of Lauderdale 
Robert, Viscount Melville

References

1821
1821 awards
1821 in the United Kingdom